Hans Rösch (24 December 1914 – ?) was a West German bobsledder who competed from the early 1950s to the early 1960s. He won four medals in the four-man event at the FIBT World Championships with one gold (1958), two silvers (1954, 1960), and one bronze (1953, tied with Sweden).

Rösch also finished sixth in the four-man event at the 1956 Winter Olympics in Cortina d'Ampezzo.

References
Bobsleigh four-man world championship medalists since 1930

Wallenchinsky, David. (1984). "Bobsled: Four-man". In The Complete Book of the Olympics: 1896-1980. New York: Penguin Books. p. 561.

1914 births
German male bobsledders
Bobsledders at the 1956 Winter Olympics
Year of death missing
Olympic bobsledders of the United Team of Germany